Count Berend Gregor Ferdinand (Fiodor Ivanovich in Russian) von Tiesenhausen (June 1, 1782, Reval – December 2, 1805, at the Battle of Austerlitz) was a Russian noble and military officer of German Baltic origin.

Biography 
Count Ferdinand von Tiesenhausen was the scion of an ancient German Baltic nobility family that settled in Livonia during the Baltic crusades in the first half of the 12th century, going on to become one of the wealthiest and most prominent noble lines in the region (Tiesenhausen or Tyzenhauz). The son of Count Hans Heinrich von Tiesenhausen (1741–1815) and his wife Catherine, born Princess von Stackelberg (1753–1826), Tiesenhausen married Princess Elizabeth Golenishchev-Kutuzov, daughter of the Russian Napoleonic-war hero General Prince Kutuzov. Elizabeth gave birth to two daughters: Catherine (1803–1888), later a lady-in-waiting of the Imperial Court of Russia, and Dorothea (1804–1863), the future wife of Count Charles Louis de Ficquelmont.

Tiesenhausen chose a military career. He fought under the command of his father-in-law and eventually became the aide-de-camp of Emperor Alexander I of Russia. He was fatally wounded at the battle of Austerlitz and fell with a flag in his hands. Napoleon, passing close to the gravely wounded Count,  said: ″What a glorious death!″. The character Andrei Bolkonsky in Tolstoy's War and Peace was inspired by Tiesenhausen. The Count was taken to the Malik family's inn at nearby Straßendorf, but he did not survive. He was first buried in the garden of the inn, then exhumed and moved to his family's estates in Reval. A marble obelisk was erected in his memory in the Lutheran Cathedral Our Lady of Reval.

Biography 
 Tatiana de Metternich,  Die Stroganoffs. Ein ungekrönte Dynastie, Munich, Kraus
 Alfons Clary-Aldringen, Geschichten eines alten Österreichers, Francfort-sur-le-Main, Ullstein, 1977

See also 
von Tiesenhausen

References

1782 births
1805 deaths
People from Tallinn
People from the Governorate of Estonia
Baltic-German people
Russian military personnel of the Napoleonic Wars